A rigid needle adapter enables electrical contact of finest structures on printed and assembled circuit boards, and also direct contact in fine-pole connectors.

The spring probes are arranged in a compact grid in the raster head so that up to 280 spring probes per square centimeter can be integrated. The rigid needles are moved to the desired contact point by the spring probes in the rigid needle adapter. Contacting pitch down to 150 µm can be tested by the movement of the rigid needles.

References

Printed circuit board manufacturing